Statistics of Allsvenskan in season 1941/1942.

Overview
The league was contested by 12 teams, with IFK Göteborg winning the championship.

League table

Results

Footnotes

References 

Allsvenskan seasons
1941–42 in Swedish association football leagues
Sweden